Dana Mathewson (born December 19, 1990) is an American professional wheelchair tennis player.
Mathewson won a major title in doubles (with doubles partner Yui Kamiji) at the 2022 Wimbledon Championships, which made Mathewson the first American woman to win a major wheelchair tennis title.

References

External links
 
 

1990 births
Living people
Sportspeople from Tucson, Arizona
Tennis players from San Diego
Paralympic wheelchair tennis players of the United States
Wheelchair tennis players at the 2016 Summer Paralympics
Medalists at the 2019 Parapan American Games
People with paraplegia
University of Arizona alumni
Alumni of University College London